Mike Ambinder is an experimental psychologist currently working as an affiliate assistant professor at University of Washington. Best known for his tenure at Valve Corporation, his research is focused on user experience and HCI applied to video games. He has been part of the development of Team Fortress 2, Left 4 Dead, Alien Swarm, and Portal 2. He is one of the pioneers in applying psychophysiological techniques in user experience assessment and adaptive systems in the game industry context. In February 2023, Ambinder announced that he had left Valve.

Ambinder holds a B.A in computer science and psychology from Yale University, and a PhD in psychology from University of Illinois at Urbana-Champaign. He has published in academic journals, and presented at main game developer conferences.

References

External links
 Valve's Approach to Playtesting @ GDC09 
 Biofeedback in Gameplay How Valve Measures Physiology to Enhance Gaming Experience 
 Accessibility in Games, Gamasutra

Living people
Valve Corporation people
Year of birth missing (living people)